Vosteen-Hauck House was a historic duplex townhouse located at St. Joseph, Missouri.  The original section was built about 1850, and enlarged with a two-story, rectangular, Italianate style section about 1885. It was constructed of brick and had a truncated hipped roof and arched windows.  It has been demolished.

It was listed on the National Register of Historic Places in 1982.

References

Houses on the National Register of Historic Places in Missouri
Italianate architecture in Missouri
Houses completed in 1850
Houses in Buchanan County, Missouri
National Register of Historic Places in Buchanan County, Missouri